Coconut Palace, also known as Tahanang Pilipino, is a government building located in the Cultural Center of the Philippines Complex in Manila, Philippines. It was the official residence and the principal workplace of the vice president of the Philippines during the term of Jejomar Binay.

It was commissioned in 1978 by First Lady Imelda Marcos as a government guest house and offered to Pope John Paul II during his papal visit to the Philippines in 1981, but the Pope refused to stay there because it was too opulent given the level of poverty in the Philippines.

Coconut Palace cost ₱37 million to build and was partly financed by the coconut levy fund, which was set up to be used for the welfare of coconut farmers. Its construction is sometimes associated with Mrs. Marcos' edifice complex, a term popularized by an architectural historian as the "obsession and compulsion to build edifices as a hallmark of greatness or as a signifier of national prosperity." It is owned by the Government Service Insurance System (GSIS).

Coconut Palace is made of several types of Philippine hardwood, coconut shells, and a specially engineered coconut lumber apparently known as Imelda Madera. Each of the suites on the second floor is named after a specific region of the Philippines and displays some of the handicrafts these regions produce. The palace is located on F. Ma. Guerrero Street at the Cultural Center of the Philippines Complex between the Folk Arts Theatre and the Sofitel Philippine Plaza Hotel. Before becoming the official residence of the vice president, the palace was used for wedding receptions.

The palace is shaped like an octagon (the shape given to a coconut before being served), while the roof is shaped like a traditional Filipino salakot or hat. Some of its highlights are the 101 coconut-shell chandelier, and the dining table made of 40,000 tiny pieces of inlaid coconut shells. Highlighted as one of the Cultural Center of the Philippines' most striking structures for its architecture and interiors, the palace celebrates the coconut as the ultimate "tree of life". From the coconut's roots to its trunk, bark, fruit, flower and shell, the palace's design, form and ornamentation echo these elements.

Coconut Palace has been a guesthouse for many prominent visitors, including the late Libyan strongman Muammar al-Gaddafi, Brooke Shields and George Hamilton.

Coconut Palace has been featured in various television programs. On the fifth season of the reality series The Amazing Race, the Coconut Palace served as the "Pit Stop" when the competing teams went to Manila. The contestants were welcomed by Luli Arroyo, daughter of former president Gloria Macapagal Arroyo. The palace was made a primary filming location for the ABS-CBN television series Tanging Yaman, standing in for Malacañang Palace as the residence of the First Family.

Coconut Palace underwent major renovations as it was being eyed as the official office and residence of the vice president of the Philippines. On February 11, 2011, it was officially turned over to Vice President Jejomar Binay upon the signing of a lease contract with the Government Service Insurance System (GSIS) with a monthly rental fee of ₱400,000.

Coconut Palace eyes Vice President Sara Duterte as the permanent residence and official Office of the Vice President of the Philippines for the future Philippine vice presidents.

Guest rooms
The palace has seven guest rooms named after Philippine provinces:

 Zamboanga Room, the first room and said to be George Hamilton's favorite
 Pampanga Room, showcases Kampampangan art with statues made of lahar from Mount Pinatubo
 Marawi Room, showcases Muslim Mindanao
 Bicol Room, Imelda Marcos' favorite room
 Mountain Province Room, containing many Cordillera tribal artifacts
 Iloilo Room
 Pangasinan Room, Ferdinand Marcos' room

See also
 Malacañan Palace, Philippine Presidential Palace

Notes

References

Official residences in the Philippines
Landmarks in the Philippines
Palaces in the Philippines
Coconuts
Buildings and structures completed in 1979
Buildings and structures in Malate, Manila